Rinehart Lake is a lake in the U.S. state of Wisconsin.

The lake derives its name from Frederick Reinhardt, a pioneer citizen.

References

Lakes of Wisconsin
Bodies of water of Portage County, Wisconsin